The Thamud were an ancient Arabian tribe or tribal confederation that occupied the northwestern Arabian peninsula between the late-eighth century BCE, when they are attested in Assyrian sources, and the fifth century CE, when they served as Roman auxiliaries. The Kingdom of Thamud was the first existing kingdom on the Arabian peninsula, according to Assyrian and Roman sources. Arabian tradition holds that the Thamud kingdom was destroyed by God. It had no written law, but the tribal leader played the role of ruler. The Thamud are mentioned in contemporary Mesopotamian, Classical, and Arabian sources, including in inscriptions in a temple erected in the 160s for the god ʾlhʾ, by the Thamud themselves. It is possible that multiple unrelated groups took on the name of Thamud; they probably spoke Old Arabic. The Thamud are not specially connected to the Thamudic scripts, an aggregate term for understudied writing systems of Ancient Arabia.

The Quran mentions the Thamud as an example of an ancient polytheistic people who were destroyed by God for their sins. According to the Quran and the Islamic exegetical tradition, the Thamud were an early Arab tribe who rejected the message of the prophet Salih. When they cut the hamstring of a female camel that God had sent down for them, despite the prophet's warnings, they were annihilated, except for Salih and his followers.

Pre-Islamic sources
The word Thamud appears in the Annals of the Assyrian king Sargon II (r. 722—705 BCE), inscribed at Dur-Sharrukin. As the "Ta-mu-di", the peoples are mentioned together with the Ephah, the "Ibadidi", and the "Marsimani" as part of "the distant desert-dwelling Arabs who knew neither overseers nor officials and had not brought their tribute to any king". Sargon defeated these tribes, according to his Annals, and had them forcibly deported to Samaria. Historian Israel Eph'al questions the plausibility of Sargon's account, as the briefness of Sargon's account seems to be at odds with the fact that such a campaign deep into Arabia would have been one of the longest wars in Assyrian history, and because no mention of plunder is provided. Eph'al instead speculates that the Thamūd and other Arab tribes may have made arrangements with Sargon to trade in Samaria, which Assyrian historians embellished as submission.

A surviving letter from Nabonidus, a sixth-century BC king of Babylon, includes an order that a "Te-mu-da-a Ar-ba-a-a", apparently "Thamudi Arab", be given several talents of silver. This individual was probably a merchant or official in service of the Babylonian court.

Thamūd is also mentioned in Classical sources. Surviving quotations from Agatharchides's On the Erythrean Sea, from the second century BCE, reports that the Thamud Arabs then inhabited a "stony and large shore" of the Arabian coastline, south of the Gulf of Aqaba. In a somewhat muddled passage, Pliny the Elder, a Roman historian of the first century CE, appears to locate the Thamūd at the unidentified inland town of "Baclanaza". Ptolemy, who lived in the second century, wrote that the "Thamuditai" tribe inhabited the Red Sea coastline, and that the "Thamoudenoi" tribe lived in inland northwestern Arabia—either or both may be references to the Thamūd—while his contemporary Uranius believed that the Thamūd neighbored the Nabateans. The Thamūd also joined the Roman armies as auxiliaries, and the Notitia Dignitatum mentions two units of Thamūd warriors serving the Roman Empire, one in Egypt and the other in Palestine.

The Thamūd are infrequently mentioned in contemporary indigenous Arabian sources, although two Safaitic inscriptions carved some time between the first century BCE and the fourth century CE refer to "the year of the war between Gšm and the tribe of Thamūd [snt ḥrb gšm ʾl ṯmd]". An important exception is a temple at al-Ruwāfa in northwestern Saudi Arabia, built by the Thamūd themselves in the 160s CE. The temple inscriptions (in Ancient Greek and Nabataean Aramaic) state that it was constructed by a priest named Šʿdt of the "Thamūd of Robathū" for ʾlhʾ, apparently the patron deity of the tribe, with the Roman government's support. Robathū is likely the ancient name of modern al-Ruwāfa. The Thamūd in question were Roman auxiliary troops, as the inscription states explicitly:

For the well-being of the rulers of the whole world... Marcus Aurelius Anthoninus and Lucius Aurelius Verus, who are the conquerors of the Armenians. This is the temple that was built by the tribal unit of Thamūd, the leaders of their unit, so that it might be established by their hands and be their place of veneration forever... with the support of Antistius Adventus, the governor.

But despite the presence of a tribe called the Thamud as late as the fourth century, sixth-century Arab poets whose works are preserved in post-Islamic sources were already referring to the Thamud as an ancient and long-lost tribe whose very name recalled the transience of all things. It is possible that the Thamud were not one tribe, and that other tribes took on the name of Thamūd after the original tribe by that name had gone extinct.

Islamic sources
Arab Islamic sources state that the Thamud were an early Arab tribe that had gone extinct in ancient days.

Thamud is mentioned twenty-three times in the Quran as part of a moralistic lesson about God's destruction of sinful nations, a central motif in the Quran. According to the Quran, the Thamud were the successors of a previous nation called the ʿĀd, who had also been destroyed for their sins. They lived in houses carved into the surface of the earth. God chose the prophet Salih to warn the polytheistic Thamud that they should worship the One God. The tribe refused to heed him, saying that Salih was merely a mortal, and demanded a sign from God. God sent down a milch camel as his sign, and Salih told his countrymen that they should not harm the camel and allow it to drink from their well. But the Thamud cut its hamstring or otherwise wounded it. God then destroyed the tribe, except for Salih and a few other righteous men. The means of God's destruction of Thamud include a thunderbolt, a storm, a shout, and an earthquake. The shout, which is an extremely loud sound, might have caused the earthquake, according to certain scholars. The account presented in Surah an-Naml also mentions nine evil people of Thamud who are immediately responsible for God's punishment of their people in a narrative reminiscent of Jewish descriptions of the demise of Sodom.

To the Thamūd, We sent their brother, Ṣāliḥ. He said, "My people, worship God. You have no god other than Him. It was He who brought you into being from the earth and made you inhabit it, so ask forgiveness from Him, and turn back to Him: my Lord is near, and ready to answer." They said, "Ṣāliḥ, We used to have such great hope in you. Will you forbid us to worship what our fathers worshiped? We are in grave doubt about what you are asking us to do." He said, "My people, just think: if I did have clear proof from my Lord, and if He had given me mercy of His own, who could protect me from God if I disobeyed Him? You would only make my loss greater. My people, this camel belongs to God, a sign for you, so leave it to pasture on God's earth and do not harm it, or you will soon be punished." But they hamstrung it, so he said, "Enjoy life for another three days: this warning will not prove false." And so, when Our command was fulfilled, by Our mercy We saved Ṣāliḥ and his fellow believers from the disgrace of that day. [Prophet], it is your Lord who is the Strong, the Mighty One. The blast struck the evildoers and they lay dead in their homes, as though they had never lived and flourished there. Yes, the Thamūd denied their Lord—so away with the Thamūd!

The Islamic exegetical tradition adds detail to the Quran's account. Accordingly, the Thamud were a powerful and idolatrous tribe living in Hegra, now called Madāʼin Ṣāliḥ, the Cities of Ṣāliḥ—in northwestern Arabia. When Salih began to preach monotheism, the Thamud demanded that he prove his prophethood by bringing forth a pregnant camel from solid rock. When God permitted the prophet to do this, some of the tribesmen followed Salih, while many powerful leaders continued to oppose him. After giving birth, the camel drank all the water from a well every two days and then produced enormous amounts of milk for the people. But it was hamstrung and eventually killed by nine people of Thamud, who then attempted but failed to kill Salih himself. Having failed to save his people, Salih warned that they would be destroyed after three days. On the first day, their skin would turn yellow; on the second day, red; and on the final day of destruction, black. This came to pass, and Thamud was annihilated. The traditional Muslim view is that the destruction of Thamud occurred before the prophethood of Abraham.

A hadith tradition preserved in the Ṣaḥīḥ al-Bukhārī collection narrates that the Islamic prophet Muhammad called Hegra "the land of Thamud" and did not allow his troops to drink from its wells or to use its water, and to never enter its ruins "unless weeping, lest occur to you what happened to them." The stone constructions of Hegra are actually mostly from the Nabataean period, especially the first century CE. The ninth-century Muslim scholar Ibn Saʿd believed that the Thamud were the Nabateans.

A poem attributed to Umayya ibn Abi-ṣ-Ṣalt, a Meccan contemporary of Muhammad who refused to accept Islam, contains a reference to the camel and Thamud. In Umayya's account, there is no Salih. Instead, the camel is killed by a certain "accursed Aḥmar", and the camel's foal stands upon a rock and curses Thamud, leading to the tribe's annihilation except for a single lame woman who is spared to spread the message of the destruction. Whether the poem is genuinely by Umayya or is a post-Islamic creation is a matter of debate.

Some Islamic sources claim that the Banu Thaqif tribe, an Arab tribe from Ta'if in the period of Muhammad, was descended from a survivor of the Thamud (sometimes a slave of Salih).

Thamudic script
Thamudic is an aggregate name for some 15,000 inscriptions from all over Arabia, which have not been properly studied and identified as separate languages. The name is a misnomer from the nineteenth century, when such texts were discovered in areas associated with the Thamud in the Islamic tradition. There is no special connection between these scripts and the tribe of Thamud.

See also
 Atlantis of the Sands
 Iram of the Pillars

References

Citations

Works cited

External links
 

Ancient peoples
History of the Arabian Peninsula
History of Saudi Arabia
Arab groups